Jorge García Santos (10 August 1957 – 15 December 2020) was a Spanish professional footballer who played as a goalkeeper.

Career
Born in A Coruña, García played for Deportivo La Coruña.

He died on 15 December 2020, aged 63.

References

1957 births
2020 deaths
Spanish footballers
Deportivo de La Coruña players
Segunda División players
Segunda División B players
Association football goalkeepers